"The Consultant" is the 17th episode in the third season of the television series M*A*S*H. It originally aired on January 17, 1975. It was written by Robert Klane, from a story by Larry Gelbart, and was directed by Gene Reynolds.

Plot overview 
Hawkeye and Trapper are off to surgical clinic in Japan, but instead of attending seminars and meetings, they intend to spend their time golfing and picking up geisha girls.

Once arriving in Japan, the two cohorts sit at a bar and chum up to a civilian medical consultant, Anthony Borelli (played by Robert Alda, Alan Alda's real-life father). They exchange stories, as Borelli is in Tokyo attending the same conference and has himself served as surgical doctor in both world wars. Trapper and Hawkeye invite Borelli to leave the "cozy locker room in Tokyo" and get some real game in a M*A*S*H unit or aid station. He politely declines and the three part ways.

Back at the camp, Henry is enjoying a soak in a makeshift wading pool that has apparently been engineered by Radar. Frank saunters up and complains loudly that Hawkeye and Trapper did not attend a single lecture at the clinic.  Henry avoids Frank by sinking under the water. Then, Trapper and Hawkeye walk out, decked in swimming shorts, flippers and floaties.  They jump into the pool, making a big splash.

As Henry broaches the topic of the clinic, a chopper arrives, and it carries Dr. Borelli who has come for a stay at the friendly 4077th.  Borelli bunks in the Swamp and prepares for his stay as visiting surgeon. Frank and Margaret are excited to meet the new doctor and Margaret puts on her usual charms.

More choppers arrive, this time with wounded.  In the OR everyone is working on patients, including Frank who is about ready to amputate a patient's leg because of a collapsed artery. Borelli intercedes and explains the process of an arterial transplant. For this procedure a new artery is grafted in, resulting in preservation of the limb. In a tense moment, Frank objects because, "Somebody might get in trouble." Eventually, Henry sends Radar to the phones so that they can track down a new artery.

In the Mess, Hawkeye, Trapper, and Borelli sit at one table drinking coffee, while Frank and Margaret sit at an opposite table doing the same. Borelli and Margaret continue to eye each other. Radar barges in, announcing that he found the artery. Trapper and Hawkeye leave to retrieve the artery while Borelli ominously declines to make the trip.

At the British Army M*A*S*H where the artery resides, Trapper and Hawkeye talk with a pompous and talkative British CO who is cordial enough, but takes his time signing over the artery.

When Trapper and Hawkeye get back to the 4077th, they have Borelli paged to the OR and the two surgeons scrub in.  Radar comes into the OR, looking upset and urges Hawkeye to go to the Swamp, where Borelli waits.

In the Swamp Borelli sits with a scared, somber expression on his face, and Hawkeye realizes that the surgeon is drunk and unfit to operate. Borelli reasons that Hawkeye can handle the surgery if Borelli directs him, and Hawkeye grudgingly agrees to go through with the surgery, which is successful.

Later, in the Swamp with tension in the air, Hawkeye mocks Borelli's excessive drinking. Borelli replies that he wasn't prepared for the intensity of the M*A*S*H unit and he had to turn to drinking in order to recover.  He explains that this is his third war, and his old age makes things harder to bear than they once were. He reproves Hawkeye for a lack of compassion and leaves, causing Hawkeye to set aside his drink.

Radar, Henry, Frank, and Margaret bid farewell to Borelli on the landing pad, and just before the chopper takes off, Hawkeye walks up the hill and offers Borelli a nonchalant tip of the hat.

Cast 
Alan Alda as Cpt. Hawkeye Pierce
Wayne Rogers as Cpt. Trapper John McIntyre
McLean Stevenson as Lt. Col. Henry Blake
Loretta Swit as Maj. Margaret "Hot Lips" Houlihan
Larry Linville as Maj. Frank Burns
Gary Burghoff as Cpl. Radar O'Reilly
William Christopher as Father Mulcahy
Robert Alda as Maj. Borelli
Joseph Maher as Major Taylor
Tad Horino as the Bartender.

References

External links

1975 American television episodes
M*A*S*H (season 3) episodes